The 1975–76 Quebec Nordiques season was the Nordiques fourth season, as they were coming off their best season to date in 1974–75, earning 92 points and finishing on top of the Canadian Division in the regular season, and making it to the Avco Cup finals in the playoffs, where they were swept by the Houston Aeros.

Quebec would have a very strong start to the season, and would battle with the Winnipeg Jets all season long on top of the Canadian Division.  Quebec would finish the season with a franchise record 50 wins and 104 points, but would finish behind the Jets, who tied the Houston Aeros with the most points in the league at 106.  The Nordiques scored a league high 371 goals, and finished with a very impressive record of 33–7–0 at home, tying the Aeros for the best home record in the league.

Offensively, Quebec was led by Marc Tardif, who had the most goals and points in the league with 71 and 148 respectively, while his 77 assists tied teammate J. C. Tremblay for the most in the WHA.  Tremblay would finish the year with 89 points, leading the Nordiques blueline.  Real Cloutier had a breakout season, scoring 60 goals and earning 114 points, as did Chris Bordeleau, who had 37 goals and 109 points.  Rejean Houle and Serge Bernier also finished with over 100 points, as they earned 103 and 102 respectively.  Gord Gallant had a team high 297 penalty minutes, while Pierre Roy was not too far behind with 259.

In goal, Richard Brodeur shattered the Nordiques record for wins, earning 44, while he posted a 3.69 GAA and earned 2 shutouts in 69 games.  Michel DeGuise backed him up, winning 6 games.

In the opening round of the playoffs, Quebec would face the Calgary Cowboys, who finished the season 3rd in the Canadian Division with 86 points, which was 18 fewer than the Nordiques.  Calgary would quiet the Nordiques home crowd in the first game, beating Quebec 3–1, then the Cowboys would win the second game by a score of 8–4 to take a 2–0 series lead.  Quebec would fall behind 3–0 in the series after Calgary took the third game by a 3–2 score.  The Nordiques managed to squeak out a 4–3 win in the fourth game, however, Calgary would end the series with a 6–4 win at Le Colisée in the fifth game, ending the Nordiques season much sooner than anyone expected.

Season standings

Schedule and results

Playoffs

Calgary Cowboys 4, Quebec Nordiques 1

Season stats

Scoring leaders

Goaltending

Playoff stats

Scoring leaders

Goaltending

Draft picks
Quebec's draft picks at the 1975 WHA Amateur Draft.

References

SHRP Sports
The Internet Hockey Database

Quebec Nordiques season, 1975-76
Quebec Nordiques seasons
Quebec